Breanne Siwicki (born 1 January 1995) is a Canadian open water swimmer. Born in Winnipeg, Manitoba she now resides in Minneapolis, Minnesota where she goes to school at the University of Minnesota while competing for the Minnesota Golden Gophers. Siwiciki competed for Manitoba at the 2013 Canada Summer Games in Sherbrooke, Quebec. There she won six medals (1 gold, 2 silver, 3 bronze) over several events including a gold in the 1,500 m freestyle and a bronze in the 5,000 m open water race. Siwicki now competes for the Canadian national team in open water swimming events and competed for Canada at the 2017 World Aquatics Championships where she finished 29th in the 5,000 m race.

References

1995 births
Living people
Canadian female swimmers
Swimmers from Winnipeg
20th-century Canadian women
21st-century Canadian women